This list includes fish with reported maximum length more than 6 metres.

See also
 List of largest fish
 Largest organisms

References

Lists of fishes